"You Make Me Feel Brand New" is a 1974 single by the Philadelphia soul group The Stylistics. An R&B ballad, the song was written by Thom Bell and Linda Creed.

Background
Stylistics tenor Airrion Love starts out the song and then alternates with Russell Thompkins Jr. The song, in a longer five-minute version, had first appeared as a track on the Stylistics' 1973 album, Rockin' Roll Baby, though that version was not released as a single.

"You Make Me Feel Brand New" was the fifth track from their 1974 album, Let's Put It All Together and was released as a single and reached No. 2 on the US Billboard Hot 100 for two weeks. "You Make Me Feel Brand New" was kept from the No. 1 spot by "Billy Don't Be a Hero" by Bo Donaldson and The Heywoods.  In addition, it climbed to No. 5 on the Billboard R&B chart. Billboard ranked it as the No. 14 song for 1974.
"You Make Me Feel Brand New" also reached No. 2 on the UK Singles Chart in August 1974. The Stylistics' recording sold over one million copies in the US, earning the band a gold disc The award was presented by the RIAA on May 22, 1974. It was the band's fifth gold disc.

Chart performance

Weekly charts

Year-end charts

Influence
Neil Sedaka used the song as inspiration to compose the melody of "The Hungry Years", noting that it contained a three-semitone key change that he found particularly appealing and called a "drop-dead chord."

Other versions 

"You Make Me Feel Brand New" has been recorded by jazz and pop artists including:
In 1975 by Vicky Leandros.
In 1982 by The Salsoul Orchestra (vocals by Christine Wiltshire and Ray Stevens).
In 1986 by Babyface.
In 2003 by Simply Red (on their studio album Home). The Simply Red version reached number 10 on the Billboard Adult Contemporary Chart.
In 2004, the song was covered by Boyz II Men.
Swedish singer Björn Skifs released Med varann''' (in English Together), a cover of the song in Swedish on his album Schiffz! in 1975 as a duet with ABBA member Anni-Frid Lyngstad.
Jamaican reggae singer Jacob Miller of Inner Circle recorded the song with Augustus Pablo.
Japanese musician Tatsuro Yamashita recorded his version in 1986, included on the album On the Street Corner 2.
Italian singer Mina included the song on the album Rane supreme, in 1987.
Roberta Flack recorded the song in 1992, reaching No. 50 on the U.S. R&B chart.
In 2003, Lil Mo made her version of the song and named it, Brand Nu. The instruments had also been enhanced and the lyrics are completely different. This song was included in her second album, Meet the Girl Next Door.
The song was recorded by Ronnie Milsap on his album Summer Number 17.
Jazz guitarist Norman Brown recorded the song in 1999.
Filipino R&B singer Jay R included the song from his 2008 album, Soul in Love.
American pop singer Johnny Mathis covered the song on his 2008 album, A Night to Remember.
Rod Stewart recorded it with Mary J. Blige on the former's 2009 album Soulbook.
Larry Carlton released a mostly instrumental version on his 2011 album Plays the Sounds of Philadelphia.
Jazz harpist Brandee Younger and bassist Dezron Douglas played an instrumental version on the 2020 album Force Majeure''.

Samples
The song was sampled in American rapper Yung Joc's song "Brand New", which featured Snoop Dogg and Rick Ross.
In January 2014, South Korean rappers Verbal Jint, San E, Bumkey, Swings, Phantom and Kanto, all from the Brand New Music agency, released "You Make Me Feel Brand New (Brand New Year 2013)", which contains a sample of this song.

Popular culture
It was also used in TV commercials for Woolite in the mid 1980s and in TV advertisements for Australian department store Myer in the late 1980s.  In Britain, a version was used to advertise BioTex stain removing powder.

References

External links
 

1974 singles
1970s ballads
1974 songs
Avco Records singles
Cashbox number-one singles
Pop ballads
Rhythm and blues ballads
Simply Red songs
Songs written by Linda Creed
Songs written by Thom Bell
Soul ballads
The Stylistics songs